The Atlanta City Council is the main municipal legislative body for the city of Atlanta, Georgia, United States. It consists of 16 members primarily elected from 12 districts within the city. The Atlanta City Government is divided into three bodies: the legislative, executive and judicial branches. The Atlanta City Council serves as the legislative branch. City departments, under the direction of the mayor, constitute the executive branch and the Courts, the judicial branch.

Legislative Branch
The legislative body, consisting of the Council, makes the laws that govern the city. It is responsible for the development of policies which serve as operational standards and establishes the parameters for the administration of city government.

Executive Branch
The Executive body carries out the laws that have been instituted by the City Council. It is responsible for the day-to-day operations of city government.

The City Charter
A new charter was enacted in 1996 that reduced the representation of Council to 12 districts and three at large posts—effective January 1998. The 1974 Charter resulted in many changes in Atlanta City government. Prior to its adoption, the legislative body was called the Board of Aldermen and each alderman was elected citywide. The 1974 charter changed the Board of Aldermen to the City Council; the vice-mayor to the president of the Council; and established 12 Council members to be elected from individual districts and six at-large posts. The administration of the day-to-day operation of city government was transferred to the executive branch, and legislative authority was vested in the Council. This system allows the Council to maintain a strong system of checks and balances.

Legislation takes two forms—ordinances and resolutions. An ordinance establishes a permanent rule of government. Every official act of the Council, having the force and effect of law, must be an ordinance. Ordinances must be read before the full Council at two regular meetings. There are exceptions, for example, a Charter amendment requires three readings.

Resolutions usually express intent or support of various projects and enterprises or establish legislative policy of a general nature. Resolutions need be read only once and can be introduced and adopted at the same meeting.

Standing Committees

The standing committees of the Atlanta City Council meet to consider legislation and to make recommendations on each item. The Committees then report their actions to the full Council. Approximately 150 pieces of legislation are handled per meeting. Citizens have the opportunity to appear before a standing committee and to express their views on any piece of legislation.

Comments from the public on matters related to zoning changes are heard by the Zoning Review Board, an independent body composed of appointed city residents. The Zoning Review Board meets once a month.

The Council is required by law to hold a public hearings on certain matters including changes to the City Charter, changes to the City Code of Ordinances, tax increases, etc. Notification must be provided to residents in advance of any public hearing.

Legislative Process
Legislation can be introduced on the floor of Council by a Councilmember as a personal paper, or can come through a standing committee. In either case, almost all legislation goes before a committee for discussion at some time. After a paper has been through the committee process, it is voted on by the full Council. The Council may accept or reject the committee's recommendations. A majority vote is needed for adoption. When a paper is adopted by the Council, it goes to the mayor for signature. The paper must be approved or vetoed within seven days. If not signed or vetoed within that period, it automatically becomes law. If vetoed, the Council can override with a two-thirds vote.

About the Atlanta City Council
The president of the City Council is elected from the city at-large (citywide). The Council consists of 15 members, 12 elected from single-member districts and three elected at-large.
The Council president presides at all meetings of the Council and votes in the case of a tie. The president of Council appoints chairs and members of the various committees, subject to rejection by a majority of the Council. The Council president exercises all powers and discharges all duties of the mayor in case of a vacancy in that office or during the disability of the mayor. Councilmembers are elected to four-year terms commencing with the first Monday in January. The most recent Atlanta City Council took office in January 2018.

The members of the Council elect a president pro tempore each year to serve a one-year term beginning with the first meeting in January. The president pro tempore presides over the Council meetings in the president's absence.

Beginning in 2014, Atlanta City Council members are paid an annual salary of $60,300 ($62,000 for the City Council President) for their service.

Current members

 Doug Shipman (President)
 Jason Winston (District 1)
 Amir Farokhi (District 2)
 Byron Amos (District 3)
 Jason Dozier (District 4)
 Liliana Bakhtiari (District 5)
 Alex Wan (District 6)
 Howard Shook (District 7)
 Mary Norwood (District 8)
 Dustin Hillis (District 9)
 Andrea L. Boone (District 10)
 Marci C. Overstreet (District 11)
 Antonio Lewis (District 12)
 Michael Julian Bond (Post 1)
 Matt Westmoreland (Post 2)
 Keisha Waites (Post 3)

Presidents

 Wyche Fowler (1974–1976)
 Carl Ware (1976–1979)
 Marvin S. Arrington Sr. (1980–1997)
 Robb Pitts (1997–2001)
 Cathy Woolard (2001–2004)
 Lisa Borders (2004–2010)
 Ceasar Mitchell (2010–2018)
 Felicia Moore (2018–2022)
 Doug Shipman (2022–present)

References

Georgia city councils
Government of Atlanta